Dynes is a surname. Notable people with the surname include:

 Ernest Dynes (1903–1968), cricketer
 Kieran Dynes (born 1970), racing driver
 Robert C. Dynes (born 1942), physicist
 Wayne R. Dynes (1934–2021), art historian
 William Dynes (1849–1935), politician

See also
 Dyne, unit of force
 Dyne (name)
 Dynes Pedersen (1893–1960), gymnast
 Oak Ridges Dynes, ice hockey team